Rasmussen is a suburb of Townsville in the City of Townsville, Queensland, Australia.

Geography 
Rasmussen is the second suburb on Riverway Drive and is between the suburbs of Condon and Kelso.

The area is flat and is bounded on the east by the Ross River.

It is a rapidly expanding suburb with many residential estates planned or under construction.

History 
Like all the suburbs in the Upper Ross and Riverway area, it is named after early settlers. Rasmussen is named after the Danish Rasmussen family (Jorgen Rasmussen). The family had a dairy farm on the Ross River.

Rasmussen State School opened on 23 January 1978.

Good Shepherd Catholic School opened in January 1996 on a  site purchased in 1993. It initially offered Years Prep to 3 with an initial enrolment of 81 students.

In 2018 two developers have announced plans for major shopping centres.

Education 
Rasmussen State School is a government primary (Early Childhood-6) school for boys and girls at Allambie Lane. In 2018, the school had an enrolment of 468 students with 39 teachers (37 full-time equivalent) and 28 non-teaching staff (19 full-time equivalent). It includes a special education program.

Good Shepherd Catholic School is a Catholic primary (Prep-6) school for boys and girls at 65 Allambie Lane. In 2018, the school had an enrolment of 309 students with 22 teachers (20 full-time equivalent) and 23 non-teaching staff (14 full-time equivalent).

There are no secondary schools in Rasmussen. The nearest government secondary school is Thuringowa State High School in neighbouring Condon to the north.

Facilities 
Upper Ross Police Facility is at 12 Bluewattle Boulevard.

Riverway Plaza is a shopping centre at 1219 Riverway Drive. It is anchored by a Woolworths supermarket. Rasmussen Post Office is in this centre.

Amenities 
Good Shepherd Community Centre is part of the Good Shepherd Catholic School complex on Alambie Lane. It is used as a place of worship by a number of denominations, including the Catholic Church and the Anglican Church.

Upper Ross Community Centre is at 43 Alambie Lane. It provides a range of social services to the public. The Police & Citizen Youth Club (PCYC) also operates from this site, providing sports facilities.

There is a bushland reserve that runs the length of the suburb between Rivewray Drive and the Ross River, known as Loam Island. There are a number of outdoor recreational facilities there including walking trails, rowing club, boy scouts, and a boat ramp opposite Illuta Street off Riverway Drive into the Ross River. It is managed by the Townsville City Council.

There are a number of parks in the area:

 Allambie Lane Park
 Beck Drive Park
 Glenrock Park
 Illuta Street Park
 Neil Mccarthy Park
 Renecol Park
 Teressa Street Park

References

"Thuringowa past and present", by Diane Vance

External links
 

Suburbs of Townsville